
Gmina Żarnowiec is a rural gmina (administrative district) in Zawiercie County, Silesian Voivodeship, in southern Poland.

Villages
Gmina Żarnowiec contains the villages and settlements of Brzeziny, Chlina, Chlina Dolna, Jeziorowice, Koryczany, Łany Małe, Łany Średnie, Łany Wielkie, Małoszyce, Ostra Górka, Otola, Otola Mała, Udórz, Wola Libertowska, Zabrodzie, Zamiechówka and Żarnowiec.

Neighbouring gminas
Gmina Żarnowiec is bordered by the gminas of Charsznica, Kozłów, Pilica, Sędziszów, Słupia, Szczekociny and Wolbrom.

References

Zarnowiec
Zawiercie County